Shah Hussain Shah (8 June 1993, London) is a Pakistani judoka. Shah competes in the men's -100 kg division. As of July 2014, he is based in Japan. Shah Hussain received the honour to bear Pakistan flag at Rio Olympics. Shah represented Pakistan in 2018 Asian Games where he won a bronze medal in -100 kg division.

Family
Shah is the son of former Pakistani Olympic boxer, Hussain Shah, who won the country's first Olympic boxing medal, a bronze at the 1988 Summer Olympics in Seoul, Korea.

Career
Shah won a bronze at the Asian Judo Championships. He has also participated in the South Asian Games where he won 2 gold medas.

2014
At the 2014 Commonwealth Games in Glasgow he was beaten in the finals of the -100 kg division by Scotland's Euan Burton.

2016
Shah represented Pakistan in 2016 Summer Olympics in Rio de Janeiro, Brazil. He is the first Judoka from Pakistan to be qualified in Olympic Games.

References

External links
 

1993 births
Living people
Sportspeople from London
Pakistani male judoka
Judoka at the 2016 Summer Olympics
Olympic judoka of Pakistan
Judoka at the 2010 Asian Games
Judoka at the 2014 Asian Games
Judoka at the 2018 Asian Games
Judoka at the 2022 Commonwealth Games
Commonwealth Games bronze medallists for Pakistan
Judoka at the 2014 Commonwealth Games
Commonwealth Games silver medallists for Pakistan
Commonwealth Games medallists in judo
Pakistani expatriates in Japan
Asian Games competitors for Pakistan
South Asian Games medalists in judo
South Asian Games gold medalists for Pakistan
Judoka at the 2020 Summer Olympics
Medallists at the 2014 Commonwealth Games
Medallists at the 2022 Commonwealth Games